Donald Roy "Ike" Forte (born March 8, 1954) is a former American football running back in the National Football League for the New England Patriots, the Washington Redskins, and the New York Giants.  He played college football at the University of Arkansas and was drafted in the second round of the 1976 NFL Draft.

College career
Forte began his college career with the Tyler Junior College, playing two seasons.  He earned junior college All-America honors in his sophomore season when he ran for 1,175 yards.

Next moving to Arkansas, Forte was the leading rusher for the team in his junior and senior seasons, earning All-Southwest Conference honors in both 1974 and 1975.  He had eight 100-yard games rushing and finished as the third best rusher in team history to that point.

In 1975, Forte was a co-captain and a key player in the Hogs winning the Southwest Conference title and, in his last college game, he led the team in an upset of the Georgia Bulldogs in the 1976 Cotton Bowl Classic.  In that game, he rushed for 119 yards and two touchdowns, earning the game's Most Outstanding Offensive Player award.

Professional career
Forte began his journeyman career in the National Football League with the New England Patriots after being drafted by them in the second round with the 38th overall pick in the 1976 NFL Draft.  In his career, Forte scored seven touchdowns while gaining 511 rushing yards on 165 carries and 387 receiving yards on 39 receptions.

References

1954 births
Living people
People from Texarkana, Arkansas
American football running backs
Arkansas Razorbacks football players
New England Patriots players
New York Giants players
Washington Redskins players
Tyler Apaches football players